Eupithecia carpophilata is a moth in the  family Geometridae. It is found in Russia (Siberia) and India (Himachal Pradesh).

References

Moths described in 1897
carpophilata
Moths of Asia